Walikale Territory is a territory located within the Congolese province of North Kivu, in the eastern regions of the Democratic Republic of the Congo. The headquarters are in the town of Walikale. The locality is situated between Bukavu and Lubutu (Maniema Province) on DR Congo National Road No. 2  in the valley of the river Lowa, 135 km to the west of Goma.

Walikale is rich in cassiterite, which is refined elsewhere into tin. As of 2008, Walikale's cassiterite resources were largely controlled by warlords empowered by the ongoing Kivu conflict. Specifically, the renegade FARDC 85th Brigade, under Colonel Samy Matumo, controlled the mine at Bisie, up to early 2009, when it was replaced by "accelerated integration" FARDC elements.

The FDLR is continuing its activities in the territory, with May 2009 attacks in Busurungi, in the area bordering South Kivu. Busurungi has around 7,000 inhabitants, spread between the villages of Bunyamisimbwa, Busurungi, Kahunju, Kamaito, Kamanyola, Kasebunga, Katokoro, Kichanga, Kifuruka, Kilambo, Kitemera, Moka, Ndaboye, Nyamimba, and Tuonane.

Territory 
The territory is divided into 2 collectivities, Bakano (4238 km²) and Wanianga (19,237 km²), and comprises 15 "groupements" totalling 90 localities. Walikale is the largest territory in the province of Nord-Kivu, with 39.46% of its surface.

The territory is bordered by Lubero Territory on the north, Rutshuru Territory and Masisi Territory on the east, Tshopo Province and Maniema Province on the west, and South Kivu on the south.

Many armed groupings, often former Interahamwe or the militias of Laurent Nkunda, control the forests and have forced a significant proportion of the population into urban settlements. These armed groups often inflict robbery and violence on the local people, as well as engage in hunting and poaching of nominally protected species.

The territory is composed of various terrestrial and fresh water eco-regions. There are transition forests in the northeast and wet tropical forests and farmed land in the southeast and from Gilbertiodendron and Uapaca to the western edge of the province.

Population 

The principal peoples of the territory are:
 Nyanga (see Nyanga language)
 Kanu (see Kanu language)
 Kobo
 Hunde (see Hunde language) (primarily in Masisi and Rutshuru Territories)
 Komo (see Komo language) (primarily in Lubutu Territory)
 Tembo (see Tembo language) (primarily in Kalehe Territory)
 Kusu (see Kusu language)
 Mbuti (Pygmies)

Armed groups

The FDLR: Forces Démocratiques de Libération du Rwanda 
The ‘Forces Démocratiques de Libération du Rwanda’ (FDLR) was initially a political-military movement that was created in 2000 by Hutu rebels that had participated in the 1994 genocide in Rwanda. During the first Congo war in 1996, the Rwandan army started to dismantle the refugee camp that had been created to host the refugees of 1994, in search of ex-FAR (Forces Armées Rwandaises). The ALIR (Armée de Libération du Rwanda), former FDLR, was, therefore, created by these Hutu rebels in order to dismiss the new Rwandan Government and to resettle a Hutu government. The use of the acronym FOCA (Forces combattantes Abacunguzi) refers to a kinyarwanda word meaning ‘saviors’ or ‘liberator’.

However, their presence in the DRC was supposed to be temporary, in order to allow them time and protection (the wideness of the territory and its forests offers much more possibility to hide than Rwanda) to build up an army and to organize their potential coup d’Etat.

The FDLR FOCA is, today, divided in three main brigades commanded by ‘Colonel’ Mutima, ‘Colonel’ Sadiki and ‘Colonel’ Omega. Their number has been evaluated between 3000 and 4500 rebels (Mercier 2009) In order to develop their influence and control over the territory, the FDLR tried on a few occasions to create alliances with the Mayi-Mayi Kifufua, Simba or Tseka, but at the moment no long term alliance has been created and fights between the FDLR and these groups are believed to have occurred on access to mines.

The FDLR have an important impact in Walikale today: from all the armed groups’ presents in the region, they are the most organized, numerous, structured and their knowledge of the territory constitutes their strength. On the other hand, the accumulation of years and years of fighting and wild livelihoods (part of their members literally live in the forest all year long) as well as the discovery that their chiefs (involved in the 1994 genocide) have absolutely no interests in going back to Rwanda (the official and initial aim of the FDLR), where they would probably be judged by the National of International court of justice.

Location in Walikale: approximate zones of FDLR’s actions.

The FDLR control the territory of Walikale on wide superficies. Their presence has been detected on a wide axis going from the east of Oninga (border with Lubutu) to Walowa Yungu (Mpito/Ntoto area) as well as on the western part of the southern axis going from the Kahrizi-Biega Park.  They have different basis:

In the South, they are currently based in Isangi (next to the river of Lukele, more or less five hours road from Itebero market) as well as Mpenbenema, Luenge (on the South Kivu direction) and Kamale (on the Shabunda direction). (Mercier 2009)
In the East, their base is located in the forest of Kabale (between Luberick and Ntoto). Ntoto used to be their basis before the first intervention of the FARDC in the region; they have now moved more or less thirty kilometers away from the east of Ntoto, in Ishunga (Mutshéri locality). Only the military police of the FDLR under the command of ‘Major Eric’ have stayed in Ntoto.

Mining activities
The areas controlled by the FDLR are mainly isolated forests and mining sites, exploited illegally and manually, with their own governance system, out of which we can identify:

The Bakano area: eight mining squares in Isangi, two in Mpango. They both are cassiterite, coltan, and gold mines.
The Ihana area: three mining squares in Ihana of gold and cassiterite.
The Luberick area: one mining square in Bana Mutati of gold and cassiterite, another mining square in Walowa of cassiterite and coltan.

Cassiterite, coltan, and gold are being extracted from these mines and brought illegally to Goma through Masisi territory. The only way to reach these sites is by plane from Goma to Walikale Centre, followed by a long trek into the forest by motor bike and on foot (of a minimum of six hours).

The Mayi-Mayi Simba 
The Mayi-Mayi Simba group was initially created in 1964 during the ‘Lumumbist rebellion’. It used to share communitarians ideals and motivations, but its motivations today are exclusively related to pillage and looting. They are located in the north of Walikale territory, on the western axis near the borders with Lubutu and Maniema (region of Oninga), but their activities have decreased in the last years in Walikale.
 
It is very hard to evaluate their number, as today they often attack in alliance with the Mayi-Mayi Tseka, or very occasionally with the FDLR. One of the most recent grouped attacks is the one lead in the famous mining site of Bisié.

The Mayi-Mayi Kifuafua 
Initially, the Mayi-Mayi Kifuafua was a self-defense group, aiming at defending their villages against the CNDP (previously called the RDC) in the region of Ufamando, in South Kivu. Today they have moved to South Walikale, in Walowa Loanda and Walowe Ubora regions, and control the southern axis of Chambucha to Karete.  This position is very strategic as it is right on the trade road linking Bukavu to Walikale. They also control the eastern area of the Chambucha-Karete axis.

The Mayi-Mayi Kifuafua is divided into two groups, and antagonisms have started to arise between the leaders of these factions

‘Colonel’ Delphin Bahenda, Walowa Loanda: this faction tends to collaborate partially with the MONUSCO and the governmental army. It has sometimes fought against the FDLR. However Colonel Delphin appears to be exclusively interested by his personal enrichment and would be manipulating the governmental army and the MONUSCO in order to beneficiate from both looting and subventions from the formers.
Colonel Jules, Walowa Ubora: Colonel Jules appears as a very egocentric person,  his personal dream of becoming a General is at the core of the faction’s ‘policy’. He refuses to collaborate with the governmental army unless he obtains the grade of General. In this perspective, this faction can potentially create an alliance with the FDLR, because of their geographic proximity and previous alliances. They have already led common attacks on populations, such as the well known massacre of 29 October 2009.

These different tendencies and orientations are believed to be at the origins of ethnic tensions between Walowa Loanda and Walowa Ubora.

The Mayi-Mayi Tseka 
The official motivation of the Mayi-Mayi Tseka is the protection of Walikale against the Tutsi invader. This faction was formed by Tseka, a merchant of ore, by young peasant from Walikale having lost their lands during the war, by some deserters of the FARDC or by formers CNDPs. Their location – on the western axis directed toward Kisangani, on the North of the cities of Mubi and Ndjingala, next to the famous mining area of Bisié – is representative of their concrete motivation, which is mining exploitation.

Accessibility

From Goma to Walikale Centre 
There are three main ways to access Walikale Centre from Goma. The easiest and most secure way is by plane: there are no internal flights between Walikale and Goma, but the MONUSCO often flies from one city to the other, as well as some commercial planes.  The landing strips are also very precarious.

The other ways of accessing Walikale Center from Goma are by land:

Taking the Northern Road: the road crosses Masisi territory and is known for being very dangerous. The first axis when entering Walikale territory is Kibati Kibua; the road is very damaged and almost unpracticable during the rainy seasons. The second axis from Kibua to Mpofi has a good road which has been rehabilitated by the NGO AAA. However, attacks on humanitarians have been reported in the surroundings of Mpofi. Finally, the road from Mpofi to Walikale is also in relatively good conditions. Frequent check points of rebels from the FDLR have been reported in the Walikale – Kibua axis (and more precisely, the Mpofi – Kibua axis). The overall trip in good conditions takes 10 to 15 hours but is not recommended to humanitarians, especially for the transportation of material.
Taking the Southern Road: by travelling across the Kivu Lake, either until Kalehe (if possible, according to the season and to availability of boats) or Bukavu. In both cases, the main road heading to Walikale is the N3, a national road following the axis Bukavu – Hombo (at the border with south Kivu) and then the axis Itebero – Walikale. The axis Walikale-Hombo (approximately 40 km)  is almost unpracticable; very few trucks take the risk to take this road, but incidents are frequents. The most frequent, and advised,  way of transport is motorbike, bikes or walking. It takes more or less 9 hours non-stop motorbike driving to reach Musenge from Walikale. From Hombo to Musenge, the axis used to be controlled by the Mayi-Mayi Kifuafua, and is now controlled by another faction of Mayi Mayi; From Musenge to Walikale via Itebero, the axis is relatively protected by the FARDC.

From Kisangani to Walikale Centre 
Another possibility to access Walikale Centre is from Kisangani, the capital of the Orientale Province. It is the longest way of the three (the distance between Goma and Walikale Centre via Kisangani is more or less 1700 km) but it is the safest. From Goma, it is possible to take planes to Kisangani. 
The itinerary from Goma to Walikale via Kisangani is the best to transport material, as the roads are good enough for trucks. It implies crossing North Kivu, following the axis Goma - Butembo, Butembo – Komanda, Komanda – Nia Nia, Nia Nia – Bafwasende and finally Bafwasende – Kisangani. Then from Kisangani to Walikale, until Lubutu, the road follows the N3, and then secondary roads link Lubutu to Walikale Centre. The overall trip can take up to one week.

Food insecurity and emergency 
In 2011, 55% of the population of Walikale has been affected by the consequences on the ongoing crisis in North-Kivu. This ongoing crisis is a security crisis but also tends to become a food crisis. Years of recurrent conflicts in Walikale has increased the vulnerability of the population and has disrupted the basic functioning of the economy and the society; without being considered as a humanitarian emergency yet, the situation in Walikale is too unstable and threatens the life of too many people to be left out of food security programs planning.

The context of protracted crisis worsened food insecurity but did not totally originate it; it is essential not to limit the analysis to insecurity itself, but also to consider the root causes of food insecurity, which can vary from one region to another. Unlike some other conflicts, where armed groups' activities and insecurity directly provokes food insecurity, in the case of Walikale it appears that structural causes, historical causes of food insecurity and insecurity itself are intrinsically linked.

Historical causes 
The disruption of customary laws over access to land: these disruptions were mainly provoked by the implementation of the Bakajika law under the Mobutu area, which was based on the nationalization of land and designation of local authorities by the state. The ambiguity around the status of land is steel subject to conflicts today.
Ethnic segregation, which started under the colonial period and was maintained under Mobutu’s dictators. This segregation was political – refusal of giving the Congolese citizenship to some ethnic group – but was also based on refusal to some ethnic groups to access land, which marginalized some parts of the population and prompted the creation of self-defense groups and ethnic tensions.
Foreign immigration during the war: the great lakes conflicts, also known as the first African World War, prompted the immigration of non Congolese ethnicities, which were later on refuted access to land; some of these ethnic groups joined or created armed groups and compensated access to land with natural resources looting and pillage of the local populations. The case of Hutu immigration right after the Rwandan genocide and of the FDLR is the best example of this form of immigration.

Structural causes 
The extension of the Kahuzi-Biega National Park: the extension of this national park encroached upon the lands of rural communities which were neither consulted nor indemnified by the government. It consequently provoked resentment of behalf of the population, some of with reconverted into mining exploitation and armed groups' activities, internally displaced people and conflicts over land.
The wideness and density of forest which represent a shelter for armed groups and represents a real challenge to stabilization programs
The impact of internally displaced people on hosting communities and families: the growing number of IDPs represents a threat to food security as the hosting families and communities are not prepared to host and to feed extra people and sometimes do not have the means to do it.
Mining activities: the reconversion of farmers into mining activities is more and more frequent. Mining activities are more lucrative and more secure than farming. This tendency is a threat to food security as it tends to diminish agrarian and pastoral production in a context of growing food insecurity.
Access to land, which is referred to as physical access to land by the local population. The tendency of armed groups to steal their food directly from the local populations had disastrous consequences on food security. Cultivation of fields, sometimes remote from the villages, has become a dangerous activity especially for women, and some communities have decided to abandon their remote fields for security reasons.
Infrastructures: the lack of adequate material and infrastructures represent a restrain to food security development as it does not allow agricultural and pastoral development (for instance, total absence of vegetal and animal epidemic surveillance infrastructures or adequate treatments in local communities) 
Access to markets: roads infrastructures in Walikale are disastrous and worsen the isolation of some communities. The absence of trade routes does not allow some population to have access to local markets, and therefore to sell their products and buy the products they need. Not only does it provoke malnutrition and poor diets in remote regions, but it is also at the origin of food prices raise.

Politics 
Walikale Territory is represented in the National Assembly by two deputies:
Elysée Munembwe (ARC)
Juvenal Munubo (UNC)

Umoja Wetu, Kimya II and Amani Leo 
After the Congolese wars, Walikale territory had known a period of relative calm: surely, armed groups' activities had not ceased, "food lootings" were still frequent, and armed groups benefited from the central state’s ignorance of the region to continue their mining exploitation activities and to extend their local power. However, almost no conflicts were going on between armed groups, and neither the governmental army nor was the MONUC was interfering with their activities.

In addition, some armed groups such as the FDLR had even started to integrate into the social and economic organization of Walikale; as shown in a report by the Pole Institute dating from 2008, the FDLR had begun to constitute "a state within a state" (Rudahigwa, 2008): customary chiefs admitted at the time that an important part of Walikale territory was under control of the FDLR, who had imposed its own rules and organization. Regular collections were organized within the local population of each village, and a part of their harvest had to be given, as a sort of tax. In exchange, the FDLR protected them. Furthermore, the members of the FDLR even started to develop economic activities other than mining looting, such as farming, local trade of foodstuff or manufactured products, and even building a hospital or social infrastructures.

Even though in 2008 the FDLR represented an obstacle to food security in the sense that, through their taxing system and their lack of integration within the local population, the population was deprived from an important part of their harvest, the stability they imposed to the region ensured a certain regularity of food production and trade. In addition, the vulnerability of the population was lower because the FDLR taxing system encouraged the production of foodstuff and the cultivation of land; the farmers and peasants were fewer victims of attacks and could access their camp with lesser fear than today.

The growing power and activities of the FDLR in North Kivu led Kagame and Kabila to plan a joint intervention in 2009, to stop FDLR activities and to repatriate to Rwanda its combatants: this 2009 Eastern Congo offensive was named Umoja Wetu ("Our Unity" in Swahili). Judging whether this first intervention was efficient or not is irrelevant here, but two months after, in March 2009, the FDLR had grown in power again and started to lead reprisal attacks on the population. In Walikale, the consequences of these reprisals led to a food and humanitarian crisis in 2009 and marked the beginning of insecurity and violence in Walikale. (GRIP, 2011)

Many "volunteers" also joined the FDLR after the Umoja Wetu operation, mostly members of the CNDP and various Mayi-Mayi groups. The FDLR therefore represented at that moment, the most powerful opposition to the FARDC and by extension, to the central government, and therefore reassembled all military groups or rebels opposed for various reasons to the Congolese government.

The consequences on the population of Umoja Wetu were dreadful: civilians became tools of the war, and the instauration of terror, recurrent massacres, and killings that followed Umoja Wetu were exclusively meant to put a pressure on the government. The military operation Kimia II and Amani Leo, led by the FARDC and supported by MONUC (which then became MONUSCO), worsened the insecurity in Walikale: not only were civilians victims of abuses meant to force the FARDC to stop their attacks, but also, entire villages were destroyed by fighting between the FDLR and the FARDC. (GRIP, 2011)

Therefore, this military operation completely destabilized the relative organization of food production and trade in Walikale. Instead of regular taxation, armed groups began to steal directly from the populations and to commit exactions in villages and on the fields. Food and rapes became weapons of the FDLR and other armed groups in Walikale, weapons that led to the current situation of food instability and humanitarian upcoming crisis.

The November 2011 election was also a factor in explaining the resumption of armed groups’ activities, and in particular of FDLR activities.  In fact, the accumulations of the alliance between Kabila and Kagame and of the various military operations led to the development of a real hatred on behalf of the FDLR against the government of Kabila; his reelection in November therefore provoked a movement of protest orchestrated by the FDLR, which once again was reflected as a resumption of attacks on the population and the intensification of fighting with the FARDC. According to a member of a local NGO, this resumption could also be related to the fact that the opposition was constituted by members supporting the FDLR and the Mayi-Mayi.

References

External links
Another Way to Protect Biodiversity: Community Conservation

Territories of North Kivu Province